Dancewear is clothing commonly worn by dancers. Items of dancewear include:
 arm warmers
 dance belts
 dance shoes
 legwarmers
 leotards and unitards
 pointe shoes
 skirts
 tights
 tutus

See also

Dance costume
Sportswear

References

 
Dancewear
Dancewear